The 2011 Hackleburg–Phil Campbell tornado was an extremely deadly, violent, and long-tracked EF5 wedge tornado that devastated several towns in rural northern Alabama, before tearing through the northern suburbs of Huntsville and causing damage in rural portions of southern Tennessee on the afternoon and early evening of April 27, 2011. It was the deadliest tornado of the 2011 Super Outbreak, the largest tornado outbreak in United States history. The tornado killed 72 people, making it the deadliest tornado in Alabama history, and injured at least 145 others. At the time, it was the deadliest tornado to strike the United States since the 1955 Udall, Kansas, tornado.

Meteorological synopsis
The environmental conditions leading up to the 2011 Super Outbreak were among the "most conducive to violent tornadoes ever documented". On April 25, a vigorous upper-level shortwave trough moved into the Southern Plains states. Ample instability, low-level moisture, and wind shear all fueled a significant tornado outbreak from Texas to Tennessee; at least 64 tornadoes touched down on this day. An area of low pressure consolidated over Texas on April 26 and traveled east while the aforementioned shortwave trough traversed the Mississippi and Ohio River valleys. Another 50 tornadoes touched down on this day. The multi-day outbreak culminated on April 27 with the most violent day of tornadic activity since the 1974 Super Outbreak. Multiple episodes of tornadic activity ensued with two waves of mesoscale convective systems in the morning hours followed by a widespread outbreak of supercells from Mississippi to North Carolina during the afternoon into the evening.

Tornadic activity on April 27 was precipitated by a 995 mbar (hPa; 29.39 inHg) surface low situated over Kentucky and a deep, negatively tilted (aligned northwest to southeast) trough over Arkansas and Louisiana. A strong southwesterly surface jet intersected these systems at a 60° angle, an ageostrophic flow that led to storm-relative helicity values in excess of 500 m2s−2—indicative of extreme wind shear and a very high potential for rotating updrafts within supercells. Furthermore, convective available potential energy (CAPE) values reached 2,500–3,000 J/kg−1.

Tornado summary

Damage at the beginning of the path ranged from EF1 to EF2. The tornado reached EF4 strength as it approached U.S. 43. One large brick home along Hayfield Road was swept completely away, with vehicles from the house thrown . Patches of scoured grass were also noted on the property. At least one of the homes swept away in Hackleburg was bolted to its foundation, and a brick home in the city's southwest portion had its poured concrete stem walls sheared off at ground level. Extensive wind-rowing of debris was also noted. Photographs were recovered as far away as Tennessee. The tornado completely debarked numerous trees in town, and even tore up poured concrete from the ground at one location. Several buildings in downtown Hackleburg were badly damaged as well. According to the Red Cross, 75% of the town was destroyed. A total of 18 people died in the Hackleburg area. The tornado was the first F5 or EF5 in Alabama since the Birmingham tornado of April 8, 1998. The presence of well-built homes swept away, extensive wind-rowing, and cars thrown hundreds of yards were the main factors that led to the EF5 rating in Hackleburg.

Continuing parallel to U.S. 43, the tornado crossed into Franklin County, reducing additional homes to their foundations as it neared the town of Phil Campbell. The tornado then tore right through Phil Campbell at EF5 intensity, sweeping away numerous homes, a few of which even had their block foundations destroyed as well. Some of the homes swept away were well-constructed. Three churches were destroyed, one of which was reduced to a bare slab. An underground storm shelter in town had its concrete roof torn off, and grass was scoured from hillsides.

EF4 and EF5 damage continued as the tornado exited Phil Campbell and tore through rural areas, sweeping away additional homes as it roughly followed County Roads 81 and 82. The tornado then reached its maximum intensity as it tore through the rural community of Oak Grove, with the damage intensity reaching well into the EF5 range and a path width over a mile wide. Oak Grove suffered a large swath of total devastation as large and well-built brick homes with extensive anchoring were swept completely away, with the debris strewn and wind-rowed long distances through nearby fields. A Corvette was thrown  and severely mangled, and a vehicle missing from one residence was never found. A large metal chicken house completely vanished, with nothing recovered at the site but a single piece of metal truss, and numerous large trees in this area were completely debarked. A total of 27 people were killed in Franklin County, mainly in and around Phil Campbell. The tornado continued into Lawrence County and maintained EF5 strength as it struck the small town of Mount Hope, where significant devastation was incurred to single-family homes and a restaurant. Nothing but the foundation and a pile of debris remained at the restaurant site, and a small portion of the restaurant's foundation slab buckled. Thousands of hardwood and softwood trees were snapped, with a significant number of trees twisted and debarked with only stubs of branches remaining. Many mobile homes were also destroyed with the frames mangled, and a single-family home was completely destroyed, with the walls and contents strewn over a hundred yards. WAAY-TV meteorologist and Mount Hope resident Gary Dobbs spotted the tornado from his front window but was unable to get to his storm shelter because he was giving a live report to viewers of WAAY. While the house was destroyed around him, Dobbs was thrown  from his residence. The door of the storm shelter on the property was torn off, but no friends therein were seriously injured. Dobbs required hospitalization.

Past Mount Hope, the tornado weakened to EF3 strength. More trees were found snapped and twisted before the tornado reached SR 24. At this location, four chicken houses were completely destroyed with much of the debris wrapped around debarked trees. TVA high voltage power line trusses were also destroyed at this location. The tornado continued northeast at EF3 strength as it struck Langtown, where multiple homes lost their roofs or had only interior walls left standing, and a gas station and a store sustained significant damage. The tornado re-intensified to high-end EF4 strength as it passed northwest of Moulton and Trinity, completely destroying multiple homes and mobile homes. Several cars were tossed into fields and wrapped around debarked trees along County Road 291 and 292. Tree and mobile home damage continued along County Roads 217 and 222, where a handful of large high voltage TVA power poles were destroyed, cutting off electricity delivery from Browns Ferry Nuclear Power Plant. EF4 damage continued northeast towards SR 20, where a restaurant was completely destroyed and two single-family houses were significantly damaged. A total of 14 people were killed in Lawrence County. Tree damage continued into extreme northwestern Morgan County.

These power lines delivered electricity from Browns Ferry Nuclear Power Plant, and without the outlet, the plant had to be shut down. The tornado continued towards the small community of Tanner.

Tanner experienced a large swath of EF4 damage and a narrow corridor of "high-end EF4 to near-EF5 damage". The storm completely swept away several well-constructed homes with anchor bolting.  One home was scattered over 300 yards with large items carried completely away. Intense ground scarring occurred in this area. The storm also tossed a large cargo container approximately 600 yards and carried several cars airborne for hundreds of yards. Several homes, a mobile home park, and a church that were destroyed by the 1974 Tanner tornadoes and later rebuilt, were destroyed once again by this tornado. As the tornado crossed U.S. 72 in eastern Limestone County, the tornado destroyed a privately owned radar and tower camera operated by NBC affiliate WAFF and continued into East Limestone, a more populated area of Limestone County where numerous homes were damaged or destroyed, with several leveled at high-end EF3 intensity in a subdivision at the corner of McCulley Mill Road and Capshaw Road. (Imagery from WAFF's radar, as seen during the station's coverage of the tornado outbreak, showed the graphical linear "sweep" indicating the scanning antenna dish briefly swaying violently in a ~70° horizontal curve as the tornado blew the dome and equipment off the radar tower. The tornado was viewed on the camera shortly before it was destroyed.) The tornado then crossed into Madison County, tearing through the suburban communities of Harvest and Toney. Many homes in Harvest were damaged or destroyed, especially in the Anderson Hills subdivision (which was also significantly impacted by a violent tornado in 1995). Numerous two-story homes were destroyed at that location, with a few that were flattened or reduced to their block foundations. Numerous trees were snapped and debarked, and several mobile homes were swept completely away. The tornado destroyed a Piggly Wiggly grocery store in Harvest, and also severely damaged a convenience store and local bank, which was shut down for months following the event. Damage in Harvest was rated low-end EF4. In Toney, the Carter's Gin subdivision was devastated as multiple poorly-anchored homes were leveled at high-end EF3 strength. The tornado then weakened significantly, twisting irrigation equipment and producing only intermittent EF0 tree damage south of Hazel Green and through rural areas as it approached the Tennessee border. In all, hundreds of homes received moderate to major damage along the path from Limestone to Madison County with many of these being total losses, and 13 people were killed.

The tornado then moved into Tennessee and continued south of Huntland. Isolated and minor EF0 tree damage was noted at the intersection of John Hunter Highway (State Route 122) and Limestone Road near the Lincoln/Franklin county line. Surveyors could not directly examine the roof given this building was on the highest ground in the vicinity. Damage with the latter was consistent with high-end EF2 damage. A chicken building with metal girding near the second home was completely flattened, consistent with EF2 damage. A farm complex south of Hickory Grove road had damage to a number of structures there. The home and the main car garage had part of their roofs removed. A barn that was protecting bales of hay was destroyed, with a few of bales blown from 100–200 feet from their original location. Most of its roof was removed, with over half of its downwind wall pushed outward. An older barn nearby suffered lesser EF0 damage to it roof, while the top half of a silo near that barn was missing. Another barn structure was completely destroyed northwest of the primary home. Other damage was noted near the intersection of Hickory Grove Road and Sugar Cove Road, with EF1 damage to some heavy farm equipment and EF0 roof damage to a nearby barn. There was evidence the tornado continued toward mountains a few miles further east before dissipating, with some trees damaged along the ridge.

Aftermath and response
In total, this tornado killed 72 people, all in Alabama. This made it the deadliest single tornado ever to strike the state of Alabama as well as (at the time) the deadliest in the United States since the 1955 Udall, Kansas tornado that killed 80 people. This death toll would go on to be exceeded by the Joplin EF5 tornado less than a month later. Damage from the tornado amounted to $1.29 billion, making this one of the costliest tornadoes in U.S. history.

In response to the damage in Phil Campbell, one of the hardest hit communities, writer Phil Campbell organized a fundraising and relief effort composed of 20 people with the name Phil Campbell or variations thereof. These Phil Campbells traveled to the community from places as far away as Australia to aid in the cleanup effort. Many of these people had planned to attend a convention in June, 2011 to commemorate the 100th anniversary of the city's incorporation.

See also
List of F5 and EF5 tornadoes
Tornadoes of 2011
2011 Tuscaloosa–Birmingham tornado – A similarly deadly tornado that was part of the same outbreak.
List of North American tornadoes and tornado outbreaks
Tornado intensity and damage
Tornado records

References

External links
 http://www.srh.noaa.gov/bmx/?n=event_04272011hackleburg
 http://www.srh.noaa.gov/hun/?n=franklin-al_lawrence_limestone_madison_franklin-tn_counties

F5 tornadoes by date
Hackleburg - Phil Campbell, Alabama
Tornadoes in Alabama
Tornadoes in Tennessee
04-27,Hackleburg - Phil Campbell, Alabama
Tornado,2011-04-27,Hackleburg - Phil Campbell, Alabama
2011 in Alabama
2011 in Tennessee
April 2011 events in the United States
Huntsville-Decatur, AL Combined Statistical Area